Sehar Broadcasting Network (GTV) is a Pakistan-based Urdu infotainment channel.

See also

Media of Pakistan

External links
www.gnews.com.pk

Television networks in Pakistan